The Canton of Vesoul-1 (before March 2015: Vesoul-Ouest) is a French administrative division, in the arrondissement of Vesoul, in Haute-Saône département (Bourgogne-Franche-Comté région). It consists of the western part of the commune of Vesoul and its western suburbs. It has 16,618 inhabitants as of 2017.

Composition 
The canton of Vesoul-1 is composed of 12 communes:

Andelarre
Andelarrot
Chariez
Charmoille
Échenoz-la-Méline
Montigny-lès-Vesoul
Mont-le-Vernois
Noidans-lès-Vesoul
Pusey
Pusy-et-Épenoux
Vaivre-et-Montoille
Vesoul (partly)

See also
Cantons of the Haute-Saône department
Communes of the Haute-Saône department

References

Vesoul
Cantons of Haute-Saône